Ramon Vinicius dos Santos (born 13 May 2000) is a Brazilian footballer who plays as a midfielder for Bahia.

Career statistics

Club

Honours
Athletico Paranaense
Campeonato Paranaense: 2020

References

External links
Athletico Paranaense profile 

2000 births
Living people
People from Piracicaba
Brazilian footballers
Association football midfielders
Campeonato Paranaense players
Club Athletico Paranaense players
Esporte Clube Bahia players
Footballers from São Paulo (state)